Written in the Stars (German: In den Sternen steht es geschrieben) is a 1925 German silent film directed by Willy Reiber and starring Maria Mindzenty, Olga Juschakowa and John Mylong.

The film's sets were designed by the art director Max Heilbronner. It was shot at the Emelka Studios in Munich.

Cast
 Maria Mindzenty as Lisbeth Gabler 
 Olga Juschakowa as Adele von Behren 
 John Mylong as Horst Raabe 
 Ferdinand Martini as Kallenberger 
 Georg H. Schnell as Heinz von Behren 
 Toni Wittels
 Hermann Pfanz
 Else Kündinger

References

Bibliography
 Grange, William. Cultural Chronicle of the Weimar Republic. Scarecrow Press, 2008.

External links

1925 films
Films of the Weimar Republic
Films directed by Willy Reiber
German silent feature films
German black-and-white films
Bavaria Film films
Films shot at Bavaria Studios